Maysville station is a train station in Maysville, Kentucky, serving Amtrak, the United States' national passenger rail service. It was built around 1918 by the Chesapeake and Ohio Railway in the Georgian style. It stands at the corner of West Front Street and Rosemary Clooney Street. It serves Amtrak's Cardinal trains 50 and 51, and has no station agent or station services. The tracks, once owned by the Chesapeake and Ohio Railway, are owned by CSX Transportation.

References

External links 

Maysville Amtrak Station (USA RailGuide -- TrainWeb)

Maysville, Kentucky
Buildings and structures in Maysville, Kentucky
Former Chesapeake and Ohio Railway stations
1918 establishments in Kentucky
Transportation in Mason County, Kentucky
Railway stations in the United States opened in 1918
Georgian Revival architecture in Kentucky